Friedrich Simon Bodenheimer or Shimon Fritz Bodenheimer (6 June 1897 – 4 October 1959) was a German-born Israeli entomologist. He wrote two major works on the history of biology and is considered the founder of entomology in Israel.

Early life 
Friedrich, Frederick, or Fritz was born in Cologne to a wealthy Jewish family: his father, Max Bodenheimer, was a prominent lawyer. He was educated in Greek, Latin, literature, arts, mathematics, natural history, and calligraphy. At 17 he wrote a study of Sappho. In 1914 he joined the University of Munich to study medicine but was interrupted by World War I where he served on the Eastern Front. He was influenced into entomology after coming across the works of Karl Escherich. He went to the University of Bonn for his Ph.D. on Tipula under Richard Hesse.

Israel 
After experiencing anti-Semitism in Russia and Germany, Bodenheimer decided to move to Mandate Palestine in 1922. He studied the Coccoidea in Italy for six months and worked with Filippo Silvestri and Guido Grandi before moving to Palestine, and joined the new agricultural experimental station near Tel Aviv. When the Hebrew University opened in 1918, he was appointed head of the Institute of Zoology and Entomology. In 1923 he married Rachel, daughter of a Russian Zionist Menahem Ussishkin, and along with her examined pre-Linnean entomological works and wrote a history of entomology. In 1927 he researched Tamarisk manna in the Sinai desert, a possible source for the Biblical version, produced from insect honeydew. In 1936, Bodenheimer published The Biological Background of the Human Population Theory based on university lectures he gave in Tel Aviv.

In his career as a professor of zoology over the next 25 years, he wrote more than 420 works. Three of his major works include Insects as Human Food (1951), The History of Biology, An Introduction (1958) and Animal and Man in Bible Lands (1956). His Materialien zur Geschichte der Entomologie bis Linné ("Materials for the History of Entomology until Linne") was published by Wilhelm Junk in Berlin and copies of the book were burned by the Nazis. His manuscript on Citrus Entomology was saved and published after the war. He published an autobiography A Biologist in Israel in 1959. In the same year, he died in London from complications following an eye operation.

Awards
In 1954, Bodenheimer was awarded the Israel Prize, in agriculture.

References

1897 births
1959 deaths
Academic staff of the Hebrew University of Jerusalem
Israel Prize in agriculture recipients
Israeli biologists
Israeli entomologists
19th-century German Jews
German emigrants to Mandatory Palestine
Israeli zoologists
Scientists from Cologne
University of Bonn alumni
20th-century German zoologists